Etki Liman LNG Facility is a floating production storage and offloading unit (FPSO) for 
liquefied natural gas (LNG) in İzmir Province, western Turkey. It is country's first floating LNG storage facility.

The floating LNG storage facility is the vessel MT GDF Suez Neptune, which sailed from France to Turkey and moored at a special pier of Terminal in Aliağa district of İzmir Province on December 11, 2016. She is capable of storing  LNG. She can regasify LNG delivered from other ships. The floating storage facility went in service as Turkey's first one of its kind on December 23, 2016. It is planned that the annual storage capacity of the Aliağa Terminal, operated by, will be 5.3 million tons.

See also

 Lake Tuz Natural Gas Storage,
 Northern Marmara and Değirmenköy (Silivri) Depleted Gas Reservoir,
 Marmara Ereğlisi LNG Storage Facility.
 Botaş Dörtyol LNG Storage Facility

References

Natural gas storage
Floating production storage and offloading vessels
Energy infrastructure in Turkey
Natural gas in Turkey
2016 establishments in Turkey
Energy infrastructure completed in 2016
Buildings and structures in İzmir Province
Aliağa District
21st-century architecture in Turkey